In 1952, the Eastern Region of British Rail introduced its own series for departmental (non-revenue earning) vehicles, including locomotives. Numbers were allocated from 1 to 1000, with blocks of 100 numbers allocated to specific types of vehicle. This page only lists the locomotives (steam, diesel and electric), which took the number 1 to 100. This block was split as follows:
1-30 : Great Northern section (maintained at Doncaster)
31-50 : Great Eastern section (maintained at Stratford)
51-100: North Eastern section (maintained at Darlington)

The Great Northern list later expanded to take numbers 31 and 32 from the Great Eastern list. Also included on this page is a former diesel locomotive that had been converted as a mobile power unit and numbered in the 9xx block used for miscellaneous vehicles.

Great Northern section

Great Eastern section

North Eastern section

Miscellaneous stock

British Rail locomotives